also Suwa Fuji is a complex volcano located on the border of the municipalities of Chino and Tateshina in Nagano Prefecture, Japan.

This mountain is one of the 100 Famous Japanese Mountains.

Outline

Mount Tateshina is a typical complex volcano. About the origin of the name of this mountain, tate means water-pepper, and shina means steps or high places. So Tateshina is literally a high mountain of water-peppers. The other name of this mountain Suwa Fuji, literally, Mount Fuji of the Suwa region.

Mount Tateshina is an important part of Yatsugatake-Chūshin Kōgen Quasi-National Park.

Route

Routes to climb up Mount Tateshina are well-developed. The most popular route is to start from the Nanagome parking lot.

Gallery

See also
 List of volcanoes in Japan
 List of mountains in Japan

References

 Shirakaba Kogen Hotel
 Official Home Page of the Geographical Survey Institute in Japan
 

Tateshina
Volcanoes of Honshū
Tateshina
Complex volcanoes